Lori E. Varlotta is an American academic administrator serving as the eighth president of California Lutheran University, a private liberal arts and sciences university based in Thousand Oaks, California. She began her tenure on September 1, 2020.

Early life and education 
Varlotta was born and raised in Pittsburgh, Pennsylvania. A first-generation college student, she earned a Bachelor of Arts in philosophy from the University of Notre Dame, a Master of Science in cultural foundations of education from Syracuse University, and PhD in educational leadership and feminist philosophy from Miami University.

Career 
Varlotta previously served for six years as the 22nd president of Hiram College. Before coming to Hiram, Varlotta spent 11 years at California State University, Sacramento, ultimately serving as senior vice president of planning, enrollment management and student affairs. She also held senior leadership roles at the University of Wisconsin–Whitewater and the University of San Francisco.

Varlotta took office as president of California Lutheran University, a private Hispanic-Serving Institution, in September 2020, becoming the first female president in Cal Lutheran’s 61-year history.

References 

People from Pittsburgh
University of Notre Dame alumni
Syracuse University alumni
Miami University alumni
Women academic administrators
Hiram College faculty
Living people
Year of birth missing (living people)
People from Thousand Oaks, California
California Lutheran University faculty
Syracuse University faculty